Ştefan Pirogan (born in Rădoaia) was a Romanian politician. He served as Mayor of Bălţi (1922–1924, 1927, 1929, 1931–1932). After the Soviet occupation of Bessarabia, Pirogan was arrested on 13 June 1941 and deported. Ştefan Pirogan was 52 when he died at Ivdel.

References

Bibliography 
 Pe Drumurile Pribegiei by Vadim Ştefan Pirogan Hardcover, Tip. Centrala,  (9975-78-010-5) Moldavian
 Destine Romanesti by Vadim Ştefan Pirogan, Boris Movila; Hardcover, Tip. Centrala,  (9975-78-236-1)

External links 
 Vadim Pirogan
 Stefan Pirogan, primar de Balti
 Bălţi, la capitale du nord de la Moldavie

People from Sîngerei District
Mayors of places in Moldova
People from Bălți
1944 deaths
Year of birth missing